Nicolás Tauber (born August 20, 1980) is an Argentine-Israeli footballer currently playing for Villa San Carlos.

He was born in La Plata, Argentina.

Playing career

During 2003 the former Maccabi Netanya manager, Gili Landau, spotted Nicolás during a scouting tour of Argentina. After discovering that Tauber was in fact Jewish and eligible for Israeli citizenship under the Law of Return, he convinced him to move to Israel and join Maccabi Netanya.

On September 13, 2003, Tauber made his league debut in an away fixture against Bnei Yehuda Tel Aviv. He gave up two goals and Netanya lost their first match of the season.  Tauber eventually returned to Argentina.

See also
List of select Jewish association football (soccer) players

References

External links
 
 Argentine Primera statistics at Fútbol XXI  
 Statistics at BDFA 
 Profile and statistics of Nicolás Tauber on One.co.il  
 

1980 births
Living people
Footballers from La Plata
Argentine Jews
Jewish Argentine sportspeople
Jewish Israeli sportspeople
Argentine footballers
Argentine expatriate footballers
Argentine Primera División players
Primera Nacional players
Primera B Metropolitana players
Estudiantes de La Plata footballers
Unión de Santa Fe footballers
Club Almagro players
Chacarita Juniors footballers
Nueva Chicago footballers
CSyD Tristán Suárez footballers
Deportivo Laferrere footballers
Argentine emigrants to Israel
Israeli footballers
Maccabi Netanya F.C. players
Association football goalkeepers
Israeli people of Argentine-Jewish descent
Sportspeople of Argentine descent
Argentine expatriate sportspeople in Israel
Expatriate footballers in Israel